A split platform is a station that has a platform for each track, split onto two or more levels.  This configuration allows a narrower station plan (or footprint) horizontally, at the expense of a deeper (or higher) vertical elevation, because sets of tracks and platforms are stacked above each other. Where two rail lines cross or run parallel for a time, split platforms are sometimes used in a hybrid arrangement that allows for convenient cross-platform interchange between trains running in the same general direction.

Reasons for usage
On the London Underground, to minimise the risk of subsidence, the tunnel alignments largely followed the roads on the surface and avoided passing under buildings. If a road was too narrow to allow the construction of side-by-side tunnels, they would be aligned one above the other, so that a number of stations have platforms at different levels.
Moreover is very useful if the line branches from the station, since diverting tunnel or tracks do not intersect each other.

Examples

North America 

Examples of split platform layout in the United States are Rosslyn on the Washington Metro's Blue and Orange Lines; Pentagon on the Washington Metro's Blue and Yellow Lines; and Harvard and Porter stations on the Boston-Cambridge MBTA Red Line. Split platforms are also at downtown Oakland, California on BART's 12th and 19th Street stations, as well as in Los Angeles Metro Rail's Wilshire/Vermont station. MARTA's Ashby station uses the configuration to separate the eastbound and westbound platforms.

In the New York City Subway, Nostrand Avenue and Kingston Avenue stations on the IRT Eastern Parkway Line have two tracks on each level, with each of the two levels serving trains in one direction. Further north on the Eastern Parkway line, Borough Hall also has split platforms. Also, stations on the IND Eighth Avenue Line have split stacked platforms between 59th Street – Columbus Circle and Cathedral Parkway – 110th Street due to the proximity of the line to Central Park. In other stations like Fulton Street, Borough Hall, and Fifth Avenue / 53rd Street, platforms are stacked due to the narrowness of the street directly above the station. One notable station, Wilson Avenue on the  BMT Canarsie Line, has one elevated platform and one at-grade platform, due to the narrowness of the line's right-of-way.

In Canada, split platforms on the Montreal Metro are located at De L'Église and Charlevoix and the Blue Line platforms at Jean-Talon, while Snowdon and Lionel-Groulx have a hybrid layout where the two directions on each line are split from each other but sharing an island platform with the other line. They are also found on Vancouver's SkyTrain, at the stations in the Dunsmuir Tunnel and at the King Edward station on the Canada Line.

Europe 

The London Underground uses split platform layouts on the deep tube lines, namely the Bakerloo, Central, Jubilee, Northern and Piccadilly lines.

Sant'Agostino station on line M2 of the Milan Metro uses the layout, as do all stations between Crocetta and Turati on line M3.

On Munich Marienplatz Station the Munich S-Bahn (suburban trains) are on two separate levels, where westbound trains depart from the lower level, eastbound trains from the upper level. Below the westbound level there is an interchange to the metro lines U3 and U6 in North-South direction.

In Nuremberg metro network, the station Plärrer has two platforms for cross-platform interchange between lines U1 and U2/U3. The upper platform is used for westbound/outbound services, while the lower one is designated for eastbound/inbound trains.

In Hanover light-metro network, Kröpcke has three levels, one for blue lines (3, 7 and 9); SW to NE, one for red lines (1, 2 and 8); NW to SE and one for yellow lines (4, 5, 6 and 11). The red lines level and the yellow lines level are situated directly below each other. An interchange between red and yellow lines is possible at Aegidientorplatz where the underground platforms are situated the same way like Plärrer. Eastbound/outbound trains use the lower platform, westbound/inbound trains use the upper one.

On Vienna U-Bahn line U3, the stations Neubaugasse, Zieglergasse, Herrengasse, Stephansplatz and Stubentor have two levels of platforms. Trains towards Ottakring (westbound) use the lower platform, trains towards Simmering the upper one. In Stephansplatz the line U1 crosses below these platforms.

On Prague Metro Line B station Rajská zahrada have two levels. Trains towards Černý Most use first level (lower), trains towards Zličín use second level (upper).

On the Brussels metro network, a similar arrangement can be found at stations Merode and Weststation (on lines 2 and 6).

Asia 

In Asia, Jingan, Yongan Market, Taipei Bridge, and Fuzhong on the Taipei Metro have split stacked platforms, Dadong on Kaohsiung Metro's Orange line, Central, Wan Chai, Causeway Bay, Tin Hau, Sai Wan Ho on MTR's Island line, Tsing Yi on MTR’s Airport Express and Tung Chung line, To Kwa Wan on MTR's Tuen Ma line, and Nanpu Bridge station on line 4 of Shanghai Metro all have split platforms. 

In Japan, examples of split platforms include Sekime-Seiiku Station on the Imazatosuji Line in Osaka, Misasagi Station on the Kyoto Municipal Subway and the Keihan Keishin Line, Ginza-itchōme Station on the Tokyo Metro Yūrakuchō Line, Machiya Station on the Tokyo Metro Chiyoda Line, and Kenchōmae Station and Sannomiya Station on the Kobe Municipal Subway. When Makuharitoyosuna Station opens on the Keiyo Line on 18 March 2023, it will become the newest split platform in the country.

In Southeast Asia, examples of split stacked platforms include Bukit Bintang MRT station and Tun Razak Exchange MRT station on the Kajang line, Sam Yot, Wat Mangkon, Sam Yan, Si Lom, and Lumphini Station on the Blue Line (Bangkok),  on the KRL Commuterline, and Promenade and Stevens station on Singapore's Downtown MRT line. The upcoming Thomson–East Coast MRT line in Singapore is set to feature many of such stations: Napier, Maxwell, Shenton Way, Marina Bay, Katong Park, Tanjong Katong. The Jurong Region Line is also set to feature one such station: Jurong East.

Notes and references

Notes

References

Bibliography
 

Railway platforms